Mulug Assembly constituency is a ST reserved constituency of Telangana Legislative Assembly, India in Mulugu district. It is part of Mahabubabad Lok Sabha constituency.

Dansari Anasuya (Seethakka) is representing the constituency from December 2018, she also represented this constituency from 2009 to 2014.

Azmeera Chandulal, former Minister of Tourism and Tribal Welfare of Telangana represented the constituency from 2014 to 2018.

TRS has not contested this seat in 2004 due to coalition with Congress party and in 2009 seat was allotted to TDP as a part of Mahakutami Adjustment of Seats.

Mandals
The Assembly Constituency presently comprises the following Mandals:

Members of Legislative Assembly

Election results

Telangana Legislative Assembly election, 2018

Telangana Legislative Assembly election, 2014

AndhraPradesh Legislative Assembly election, 2009

AndhraPradesh Legislative Assembly election, 2004

AndhraPradesh Legislative Assembly election, 1999

See also
 List of constituencies of Telangana Legislative Assembly

References

Assembly constituencies of Telangana
Hanamkonda district